The 2012 Purdue Boilermakers baseball team was a baseball team that represented Purdue University in the 2012 NCAA Division I baseball season. The Boilermakers are members of the Big Ten Conference and played their home games at Lambert Field in West Lafayette, Indiana. They were led by fourteenth-year head coach Doug Schreiber.

Preseason
In 2011, Purdue compiled a 37–20 record (14–10 in conference play) during the regular season, failing to qualify for a postseason for the fourth straight season.

Roster

Schedule

! style="" | Regular Season
|- valign="top" 

|- align="center" bgcolor="#ccffcc"
| 1 || February 18 || Connecticut || Walter Fuller Complex • St. Petersburg, Florida || 9–4 || Mascarello (1–0) || Fischer (0–1) || None || 301 || 1–0 || –
|- align="center" bgcolor="#ccffcc"
| 2 || February 18 ||  || Al Lang Stadium • St. Petersburg, Florida || 6–0 || Breedlove (1–0) || Ring (0–1) || None || 224 || 2–0 || –
|- align="center" bgcolor="#ccffcc"
| 3 || February 19 ||  || Al Lang Stadium • St. Petersburg, Florida || 15–8 || Collins (1–0) || Richter (0–1) || None || 321 || 3–0 || –
|- align="center" bgcolor="#ccffcc"
| 4 || February 25 || #20  || Clark–LeClair Stadium • Greenville, North Carolina || 6–4 || Haase (1–0) || Brandt (1–1) || Wittgren (1) ||  –|| 4–0 || –
|- align="center" bgcolor="#ffcccc"
| 5 || February 25 ||  || Clark–LeClair Stadium • Greenville, North Carolina || 1–11 || Carroll (1–0) || Breedlove (1–1) || None || 3,108 || 4–1 || –
|- align="center" bgcolor="#ccffcc"
| 6 || February 25 ||  || Clark–LeClair Stadium • Greenville, North Carolina || 14–7 || Andrzejewski (1–0) || Nadale (0–1) || None || – || 5–1 || –
|-

|- align="center" bgcolor="#ccffcc"
| 7 || March 2 ||  || Samford Stadium – Hitchcock Field at Plainsman Park • Auburn, Alabama || 9–8  || Mascarello (2–0) || Ortman (0–1) || Wittgren (2) || 2,924 || 6–1 || –
|- align="center" bgcolor="#ccffcc"
| 8 || March 3 ||  || Samford Stadium – Hitchcock Field at Plainsman Park • Auburn, Alabama || 10–9 || DeAno (1–0) || Giannini (1–1) || None || – || 7–1 || –
|- align="center" bgcolor="#ccffcc"
| 9 || March 4 ||   || Samford Stadium – Hitchcock Field at Plainsman Park • Auburn, Alabama || 5–2 || Gunter (1–0) || Dolan (1–1) || Wittgren (3) || – || 8–1 || –
|- align="center" bgcolor="#ccffcc"
| 10 || March 9 ||  || Reagan Field • Murray, Kentucky || 5–2 || Mascarello (3–0) || Beers (1–1) || None || 127 || 9–1 || –
|- align="center" bgcolor="#ccffcc"
| 11 || March 10 || Murray State || Reagan Field • Murray, Kentucky || 22–1 || Breedlove (2–1) || Finch (2–1) || None || 167 || 10–1 || –
|- align="center" bgcolor="#ccffcc"
| 12 || March 11 || Murray State || Reagan Field • Murray, Kentucky || 13–2 || Gunter (2–0) || Vonder Haar (1–2) || None || 151 || 11–1 || –
|- align="center" bgcolor="#ccffcc"
| 13 || March 13 ||  || Hammons Field • Springfield, Missouri || 5–2 || Mascarello (4–0) || Murphy (2–1) || Wittgren (4) || 1,575 || 12–1 || –
|- align="center" bgcolor="#ccffcc"
| 14 || March 15 ||  || Eck Stadium • Wichita, Kansas || 8–3 || DeAno (2–0) || Vielock (0–1) || None || 2,427 || 13–1 || –
|- align="center" bgcolor="#ccffcc"
| 15 || March 16 || Wichita State || Eck Stadium • Wichita, Kansas || 10–5 || Haase (2–0) || Minnis (1–3) || None || 2,559 || 14–1 || –
|- align="center" bgcolor="#ffcccc"
| 16 || March 17 || Wichita State || Eck Stadium • Wichita, Kansas || 2–8 || Smith (3–1) || Breedlove (2–2) || Vielock (1) || – || 14–2 || –
|- align="center" bgcolor="#ffcccc"
| 17 || March 17 || Wichita State || Eck Stadium • Wichita, Kansasy || 3–5 || Ladwig (2–1) || Mascarello (4–1) || Elam (5) || 2,875 || 14–3 || –
|- align="center" bgcolor="#ccffcc"
| 18 || March 24 ||  || Bill Davis Stadium • Columbus, Ohio || 8–5 || Haase (3–0) || Long (0–1) || Mascarello (1) || – || 15–3 || 1–0
|- align="center" bgcolor="#ccffcc"
| 19 || March 24 || Ohio State || Bill Davis Stadium • Columbus, Ohio || 8–1 || Breedlove (3–2) || King (2–2) || None || 1,018 || 16–3 || 2–0
|- align="center" bgcolor="#ffcccc"
| 20 || March 25 || Ohio State || Bill Davis Stadium • Columbus, Ohio || 4–5 || Kuchno (4–1) || DeAno (2–1) || None || 798 || 16–4 || 2–1
|- align="center" bgcolor="#ccffcc"
| 21 || March 27 || #15  || Lambert Field • West Lafayette, Indiana || 2–1 || Mascarello (5–1) || Self (0–1) || None || 763 || 17–4 || 2–1
|- align="center" bgcolor="#ccffcc"
| 22 || March 28 ||  || Lambert Field • West Lafayette, Indiana || 2–1 || Ramer (1–0) || Tursell (0–3) || None || 389 || 18–4 || 2–1
|- align="center" bgcolor="#ccffcc"
| 23 || March 30 ||  || Lambert Field • West Lafayette, Indiana || 9–3 || Haase (4–0) || Walter (0–5) || None || 572 || 19–4 || 3–1
|- align="center" bgcolor="#ccffcc"
| 24 || March 31 || Penn State || Lambert Field • West Lafayette, Indiana || 2–0 || Breedlove (4–2) || Kurrasch (1–2) || None || 707 || 20–4 || 4–1
|-

|- align="center" bgcolor="#ffcccc"
| 25 || April 1 || Penn State || Lambert Field • West Lafayette, Indiana || 6–16 || Hill (1–3) || Gunter (2–1) || None || 623 || 20–5 || 4–2
|- align="center" bgcolor="#ccffcc"
| 26 || April 4 ||  || Victory Field • Indianapolis, Indiana || 6–1 || Ramer (2–0) || Vogt (3–2) || None || 778 || 21–5 || 4–2
|- align="center" bgcolor="#ccffcc"
| 27 || April 6 ||  || Rocky Miller Park • Evanston, Illinois || 3–1 || Haase (5–0) || Brooke (1–3) || None || – || 22–5 || 5–2
|- align="center" bgcolor="#ccffcc"
| 28 || April 7 || Northwestern || Rocky Miller Park • Evanston, Illinois || 3–1 || Breedlove (5–2) || Magallones (5–1) || Wittgren (5) || 623 || 23–5 || 6–2
|- align="center" bgcolor="#ccffcc"
| 29 || April 8 || Northwestern || Rocky Miller Park • Evanston, Illinois || 8–4 || Podkul (1–0) || Morton (1–6) || None || 282 || 24–5 || 7–2
|- align="center" bgcolor="#ccffcc"
| 30 || April 11 ||  || Ball Diamond • Muncie, Indiana || 15–2 || Ramer (3–0) || Brewer (0–3) || None || – || 25–5 || 7–2
|- align="center" bgcolor="#ccffcc"
| 31 || April 13 ||  || Lambert Field • West Lafayette, Indiana || 3–0 || Haase (6–0) || Johnson (5–3) || Wittgren (6) || 551 || 26–5 || 8–2
|- align="center" bgcolor="#ccffcc"
| 32 || April 15 || Illinois || Lambert Field • West Lafayette, Indiana || 4–1 || Breedlove (6–2) || Kravitz (5–3) || Wittgren (7) || – || 27–5 || 9–2
|- align="center" bgcolor="#ccffcc"
| 33 || April 15 || Illinois || Lambert Field • West Lafayette, Indiana || 5–3 || Mascarello (6–1) || Milroy (1–4) || None || 624 || 28–5 || 10–2
|- align="center" bgcolor="#ccffcc"
| 34 || April 17 ||  || Les Miller Field at Curtis Granderson Stadium • Chicago, Illinois || 15–2 || Ramer (4–0) || Salemi (0–4) || None || 139 || 29–5 || 10–2
|- align="center" bgcolor="#ccffcc"
| 35 || April 20 || Nebraska || Haymarket Park • Lincoln, Nebraska || 8–5 || Mascarello (7–1) || Niederklein (2–2) || None || 4,702 || 30–5 || 11–2
|- align="center" bgcolor="#ffccc"
| 36 || April 21 || Nebraska || Haymarket Park • Lincoln, Nebraska || 3–8 || Pierce (5–1) || Breedlove (6–3) || None || 6,247 || 30–6 || 11–3
|- align="center" bgcolor="#ccffcc"
| 37 || April 22 || Nebraska || Haymarket Park • Lincoln, Nebraska || 8–3 || Podkul (2–0) || Hirsch (4–3) || None || 6,014 || 31–6 || 12–3
|- align="center" bgcolor="#ccffcc"
| 38 || April 24 ||  || Duffy Bass Field • Normal, Illinois || 3–2 || Ramer (5–0) || Sorkin (2–3) || Wittgren (9) || 413 || 32–6 || 12–3
|- align="center" bgcolor="#ccffcc"
| 39 || April 27 ||  || Lambert Field • West Lafayette, Indiana || 6–2 || Haase (7–0) || Bucciferro (3–3) || None || 772 || 33–6 || 13–3
|- align="center" bgcolor="#ccffcc"
| 40 || April 28 || Michigan State || Lambert Field • West Lafayette, Indiana || 4–3 || Mascarello (8–1) || Popp (2–1) || None || – || 34–6 || 14–3
|- align="center" bgcolor="#ffcccc"
| 41 || April 29 || Michigan State || Lambert Field • West Lafayette, Indiana || 0–5 || Garner (3–3) || Podkul (2–1) || None || 757 || 34–7 || 14–4
|-

|- align="center" bgcolor="#ffccc"
| 42 || May 5 || #14 UCLA || Jackie Robinson Stadium • Los Angeles, California || 1–5 || Plutko (6–3) || Haase (7–1) || None || – || 34–8 || 14–4
|- align="center" bgcolor="#ffccc"
| 43 || May 5 || #14 UCLA || Jackie Robinson Stadium • Los Angeles, California || 2–3 || Vander Tuig (6–3) || Breedlove (6–4) || Griggs || 1,374 || 34–9 || 14–4
|- align="center" bgcolor="#ccffcc"
| 44 || May 6 || #14 UCLA  || Jackie Robinson Stadium • Los Angeles, California || 15–11 || Wittgren (1–0) || Watson (8–2) || None || 1,529 || 35–9 || 14–4
|- align="center" bgcolor="#ccffcc"
| 45 || May 8 || IPFW  || Parkview Field • Fort Wayne, Indiana || 11–4 || Gannon (1–0) || Kimball (0–3) || None || 848 || 36–9 || 14–4
|- align="center" bgcolor="#ccffcc"
| 46 || May 9 || UIC || Lambert Field • West Lafayette, Indiana || 11–4 || Ramer (6–0) || Suminski (1–1) || None || 333 || 37–9 || 14–4
|- align="center" bgcolor="#ccffcc"
| 47 || May 11 ||  || Lambert Field • West Lafayette, Indiana || 4–0 || Haase (8–1) || Sinnery (4–5) || None || 667 || 38–9 || 15–4
|- align="center" bgcolor="#ccffcc"
| 48 || May 12 || Michigan || Lambert Field • West Lafayette, Indiana || 14–3 || Breedlove (7–4) || Lakatos (0–6) || None || – || 39–9 || 16–4
|- align="center" bgcolor="#ffcccc"
| 49 || May 13 || Michigan || Lambert Field • West Lafayette, Indiana || 3–4 || Ballantine (2–3) || Podkul (2–2) || Brosnahan (1) || 631 || 39–10 || 16–5
|- align="center" bgcolor="#ccffcc"
| 50 || May 15 ||  || Lambert Field • Lafayette, Indiana || 2–1 || Wittgren (2–0) || Machado (0–2) || None || 771 || 40–10 || 16–5
|- align="center" bgcolor="#ccffcc"
| 51 || May 17 ||  || Duane Banks Field • Iowa City, Iowa || 11–8 || Haase (9–1) || Dermody (1–7) || Mascarello (2) || 546 || 41–10 || 17–5
|- align="center" bgcolor="#ffcccc"
| 52 || May 18 || Iowa || Duane Banks Field • Iowa City, Iowa || 1–6 || Kuebel (6–0) || Breedlove (7–5) || None || 1,260 || 41–11 || 17–6
|- align="center" bgcolor="#ffcccc"
| 53 || May 19 || Iowa || Duane Banks Field • Iowa City, Iowa || 6–7 || Hippen (4–7) || Podkul (2–3) || Brown (7) || 770 || 41–12 || 17–7
|-

|-
! style="" | Postseason
|- valign="top" 

|- align="center" bgcolor="#ccffcc"
| 54 || May 24 || Ohio State || Huntington Park • Columbus, Ohio || 5–4 || Haase (10–1) || Kuchno (8–4) || Wittgren (10) || 2,257 || 42–12 || 17–7
|- align="center" bgcolor="#ccffcc"
| 55 || May 25 ||  || Huntington Park • Columbus, Ohio || 3–0 || Breedlove (8–5) || Hart (5–5) || Mascarello (3) || 1,200 || 43–12 || 17–7
|- align="center" bgcolor="#ccffcc"
| 56 || May 26 || Indiana || Huntington Park • Columbus, Ohio || 6–5 || Wittgren (3–0) || Hoffman (8–2) || None || – || 44–12 || 17–7
|-

|-
! style="" | Postseason
|- valign="top" 

|- align="center" bgcolor="#ccffcc"
| 57 || June 1 ||  || U.S. Steel Yard • Gary, Indiana || 7–2 || Haase (11–1) || Deetjen (8–3) || None || 5,047 || 45–12 || 17–7
|- align="center" bgcolor="#ffcccc"
| 58 || June 2 || #25 Kent State || U.S. Steel Yard • Gary, Indiana || 3–7 || Bores (9–5) || Breedlove (8–6) || None || 2,610 || 45–13 || 17–7
|- align="center" bgcolor="#ffcccc"
| 59 || June 3 || #11 Kentucky || U.S. Steel Yard • Gary, Indiana || 3–6 || Littrell (9–2) || Rammer (6–1) || Phillips (8) || 1,492 || 45–14 || 17–7
|-

References

Purdue
Purdue Boilermakers baseball seasons
Purdue
Big Ten Conference baseball champion seasons